The Eyes of Tammy Faye is a 2021 American biographical drama film directed by Michael Showalter from a screenplay by Abe Sylvia, based on the 2000 documentary of the same name by Fenton Bailey and Randy Barbato of World of Wonder. The film tells the story of Tammy Faye Bakker (played by Jessica Chastain), from her humble beginnings growing up in International Falls, Minnesota, through the rise and fall of her televangelism career and marriage to Jim Bakker (played by Andrew Garfield). Cherry Jones and Vincent D'Onofrio also star. The film is produced by Chastain's production company, Freckle Films.

The Eyes of Tammy Faye had its world premiere at the Toronto International Film Festival in September 2021, and was released on September 17, 2021, by Searchlight Pictures. Critics praised the performances (particularly Chastain's) while criticizing the screenplay, deeming the film to be inferior to the documentary. At the 94th Academy Awards the film won Best Actress (for Chastain) and Best Makeup and Hairstyling. Chastain also won the SAG Award and Critics' Choice Movie Award for Best Actress.

Plot
Tamara "Tammy" Faye LaValley falls in love with Jim Bakker while studying at North Central Bible College in Minneapolis, Minnesota. The two marry despite disapproval from Tammy's mother Rachel, dropping out of college to preach and inspire Christian communities across the United States. Their preaching gets the attention of Pat Robertson's Christian Broadcasting Network, who hires them as hosts of children's show Jim and Tammy. Jim later becomes the first host of CBN's The 700 Club while the two welcome daughter Tammy Sue.

Tammy and Jim meet conservative pastor Jerry Falwell during a party, with Jerry expressing interest in working with CBN. Following an argument with Falwell in which Tammy dismisses the politicization of faith, she encourages Jim to create their own television network so that they can have control over their own programs. The two leave CBN and create the PTL Satellite Network, with their flagship show The PTL Club becoming popular over the years. Tammy invites Rachel and stepfather Fred to move in with them at their Tega Cay, South Carolina compound, after which Rachel expresses her growing suspicions over how PTL gets its money.

As the press becomes more skeptical and critical of PTL's handling of its finances, Tammy becomes flirtatious with music producer Gary S. Paxton, whom Jim fires following the birth of their son Jay. In the 1980s, Jim then focuses his attention on building a Christian theme park while Tammy becomes addicted to pills and discouraged by Falwell's political oversight. Falwell decries the "gay cancer." She invites AIDS patient and Christian pastor Steve Pieters for an interview about supporting the gay community, much to Falwell's disapproval.

After collapsing during a taping, Tammy argues with Jim over their strained relationship. Falwell takes control of PTL following news scandals about PTL's financial debt and Jim's extramarital affairs, including speculations about sexual relationships with men. Jim is ultimately imprisoned for fraud.

By 1992, Tammy and Jim have officially divorced, Rachel has died, and Tammy is struggling to revive her career and find television gigs. She gets an offer to be the special guest for a Christian concert at Oral Roberts University, which she hesitantly accepts. She preaches before performing a moving rendition of Battle Hymn of the Republic, during which she imagines a rousing gospel choir performing with her.

A textual epilogue reveals Falwell died in 2007, Jim returned to televangelism for a revived PTL after being released from prison, and Tammy continued to support LGBTQ+ communities until she died in July 20, 2007 at her home in Loch Lloyd, near Kansas City, Missouri, after an eleven-year bout with cancer at the age of 65.

Cast

Production
It was announced in May 2019 that Jessica Chastain and Andrew Garfield were cast to star in the film, with Michael Showalter directing. The film was produced through Jessica Chastain's production company, Freckle Films. Chastain detailed in an August 2019 interview she had acquired the rights to Tammy Faye Bakker's life in 2012. In October 2019, Cherry Jones joined the cast of the film. Chastain and Jones had both starred on Broadway in The Heiress, and Chastain was an admirer of Jones' work. In November 2019, Sam Jaeger, Vincent D'Onofrio, Gabriel Olds, Mark Wystrach, Chandler Head, Fredric Lehne and Jay Huguley joined the cast of the film.

Principal photography began in October 2019 in Charlotte, North Carolina.

Chastain stated in interviews that the makeup for the film took between 4–7 hours in the makeup chair having prosthetics added to her face. Chastain also wore false teeth in certain scenes to match the way Tammy Faye smiled. Chastain performs several songs from Bakker's musical catalog in the film. Tammy Sue Bakker-Chapman, the daughter of Jim and Tammy, performed on the film's soundtrack with a cover of "Don't Give Up (On the Brink of a Miracle)".

Release
The film had its world premiere at the 2021 Toronto International Film Festival on September 12, 2021, and was also an official selection at several other film festivals including 69th San Sebastián International Film Festival, Tokyo International Film Festival, Sedona Film Festival and the Sydney Film Festival. The film was released on September 24, 2021.
The film hosted a pink-carpet premiere in New York City on September 14, 2021, at the SVA Theatre.

The film was released on Blu-ray on November 16, 2021. The film was later made available to stream on HBO Max in February 2022 in the US.

Music
The film's soundtrack was released on September 17, 2021, by Hollywood Records. The score for the film by Theodore Shapiro was also released as a separate album. Chastain worked with music producer Dave Cobb to record the soundtrack.

Reception

Box office 
The Eyes of Tammy Faye debuted in 450 theaters and grossed $675,000 in its opening weekend (an average of $1,500 per venue). Deadline Hollywood wrote that outside of Los Angeles, New York City, and Austin, the grosses "weren't good", and an indication that "older arthouse crowds are [not] back" to theaters due to the COVID-19 pandemic.

Critical response 

 The website's critics consensus reads: "The Eyes of Tammy Faye might have focused more sharply on its subject's story, but Jessica Chastain's starring performance makes it hard to look away." Metacritic assigned the film an average weighted score of 55 out of 100, based on 48 critics, indicating "mixed or average reviews". Audiences polled by CinemaScore gave the film an average grade of "B+" on an A+ to F scale.

Despite the mixed reviews for the film, Jessica Chastain ended up winning the Academy Award, along with a SAG and Critics Choice Awards for Best Actress.

Accolades

See also
 The Eyes of Tammy Faye – A documentary released in 2000 featuring Bakker. 
 Tammy Faye: Death Defying – A follow-up documentary released in 2005 detailing her battles with cancer.
 Fall From Grace – A television film released in 1990, starring Bernadette Peters as Bakker.

References

External links
 
 

2021 films
2021 biographical drama films
American biographical drama films
Biographical films about singers
Films about drugs
Films about evangelicalism
Films about marriage
Films about television people
Films directed by Michael Showalter
Films featuring a Best Actress Academy Award-winning performance
Films scored by Theodore Shapiro
Films set in 1960
Films set in 1964
Films set in 1970
Films set in 1974
Films set in 1975
Films set in 1978
Films set in 1989
Films set in 1994
Films set in the 1960s
Films set in the 1970s
Films set in the 1980s
Films set in the 1990s
Films set in California
Films set in Minnesota
Films set in North Carolina
Films set in South Carolina
Films set in Virginia
Films shot in North Carolina
Films that won the Academy Award for Best Makeup
HIV/AIDS in American films
Searchlight Pictures films
TSG Entertainment films
2020s English-language films
2020s American films